Salvia rubescens is a herbaceous perennial flowering plant native to the state of Mérida in Venezuela. The University of California Botanical Garden had been growing it since 1993 from a plant collected that year in Venezuela, only identifying it as S. rubescens in 2001.

The flower stems and the calyx are both dark purple and covered with fine hairs. The  flowers are a vibrant red-orange color, growing in widely spaced whorls. Many flowers come into bloom at the same time, making for a very showy plant.

The Latin specific epithet rubescens means "becoming red".

Notes

rubescens
Flora of Venezuela
Plants described in 2001